The Imperial Doctress is a 2016 Chinese television series based on the story of Tan Yunxian, a female physician during the Ming dynasty in China. It stars Cecilia Liu as the titular character. The series aired every day at 7.30pm on Jiangsu TV and Dragon TV, from 13 February to 9 March 2016.

Synopsis
Set in the Ming Dynasty during the rule of Emperor Yingzong,  Tan Yunxian (Cecilia Liu) came from a long line of medicine practitioners, her family having served as court physicians for several generations. However, the practice for female physicians came to a halt when many were framed for abusing the form. Yet, Yunxian was determined to learn medicine and she did so in secrecy. Through her enthusiasm and persistence, Yunxian overcame many difficulties and rose through the ranks to become the most famous female doctor of the Ming Dynasty. Along the way, she meets and falls in love with Zhu Qizhen (Wallace Huo) and Zhu Qiyu (Huang Xuan), two royal siblings with opposite personalities who enter into a rivalry for the throne.

Cast

Main
Cecilia Liu as Tan Yunxian (譚允賢)
Zhang Zimu as young Yun Xian
Wallace Huo as Zhu Qizhen (朱祁鎮)
Lou Yunhao as young Qi Zhen
Huang Xuan as Zhu Qiyu (朱祁鈺)
Wu Ze Jin Xi as young Qi Yu

Supporting

Royals (House of Zhu)
Li Cheng Yuan as Empress Qian (錢皇后), Zhu Qizhen's wife
Hu Shun Er as young Empress Qian
Gina Jin as Wang Meilin (汪美麟), Zhu Qiyu's wife
He Qing as Empress Dowager Sun (孫太后), Zhu Qizhen's mother
He Yin as Empress Dowager Wu (吳太后), Zhu Qiyu's mother
Gu Yan as deposed Empress Hu (靜慈師太)
Sheng Lang Xi as Imperial Consort Zhou (周貴妃), Zhu Qizhen's concubine
Jin Xiang as Consort Li (權麗妃), Zhu Qizhen's concubine
Leo Wu as teenage Zhu Jianshen (朱見深), Zhu Qizhen and Empress Qian's son
Xia Zi Yu as child Jianshen
Yuan Bingyan as Consort Liu

Northern Yuan
Yuan Wen Kang as Ye Xian (也先), Ruler of the Northern Yuan. He likes Tan Yunxian.
Li Chao as Bayan Temür (伯顏帖木兒), Ye Xian's younger brother and Zhu Qizhen's good friend
Feng Li Li as Tuo Buhua (脫不花), Ye Xian's younger sister. She likes Zhu Qizhen.
Zuo Jin Zhu as Meng Duo (蒙多)

Tan (Hang) Household
Cui Ke Qu as Tan Fu (譚復), Yun Xian's grandfather
Wang Li Yuan as Old Mrs Tan (譚老夫人), Yun Xian's grandmother
Wang Xin Min as Tan Gang (譚綱), Yun Xian's father
Zhang Yi Jie as Tan Yunliang (譚允良), Yun Xian's brother
Yu Shasha as Zi Su (紫蘇), Yun Xian's personal attendant

Royal Physicians 
Liu Li Wei as Liu Pingan (劉平安), Yun Xian's master
Zhang Lei as Cheng Shisan (程十三), the main antagonist who later betrays the Ming Dynasty
Zhang Hao Ran as Cheng Cunxia (程村霞), Yun Xian's senior

Court Officials and servants
Zhang Bo Jun as Wang Ying (汪瑛), Wang Meilin's father
Deng Li Min as Wang Zhen (王振), Zhu Qizhen's ally
Lu Sen Bao as Cao Jixiang (曹吉祥), Zhu Qiyu's ally
Yang Guang as Zhao Guogong (趙國公)
Xu Pengkai as General Shi Heng (石亨)
Qu Zhe Ming as Xiao Shun Zi (小順子), Zhu Qizhen's servant
Li Wei Ting as Xiao Ma Zi (小馬子), Zhu Qiyu's servant
Hu Bingqing as Ru Xiang (如香), Empress Qian's personal attendant
Lu Yuan Yuan as Ding Xiang (丁香), Yun Xian's personal attendant
Ma Xiang Yi as Lan Cao (蘭草), Wang Meilin's personal attendant
Tan Xin Rou as Yu Xiang (玉香), Empress Dowager Sun's personal attendant
Fang Gong Min as Fan Gong (范弘), Empress Dowager Sun's confidante

Others
Zhu Hong as Chen Biniang (陳碧娘), a dancer at Nan Xi Brothel
Wang Chun Yuan as Wang Daoshi (王道士), Head of Nan Xi Brothel and Yun Xian's master
Lv Liang as Yu Dongyang (于东阳), Yun Xian's godfather
Lu Fang Mei as Madame Yu (于夫人), Yun Xian's godmother
Fang Zi Chun as Luo Da Niang (罗大娘), a female physician who once taught Yun Xian

Historical accuracy

The titular character in the drama series, Tan Yunxian, is a real-life historical figure who came from a renowned medical family. She was one of the few female physicians/doctors that was known to exist in history. Before her death, she published a book titled "Sayings of a Female Doctor", which was passed on throughout generations.
However, the romance depicted in the drama between Tan Yunxian and the two Emperors is strictly fictional. In reality, Tan Yunxian did not exist in the same time period as Zhu Qizhen and Zhu Qiyu, and naturally would not be able to work at the Zhengtong Emperor's Palace. The character in the story is actually a combination of Tan Yunxian and the historical Empress Hang.

During the writing of the drama, screenwriter Zhang Wei consulted professional Chinese physicians regarding medical terminology and prescription use. Lead actress Cecilia Liu reportedly took lessons with a traditional physician to learn the basics of Chinese medicine and treatment (such as acupuncture, taking pulse and massage techniques) in preparation for the role.

Soundtrack

Reception
The series received positive feedback from the audience and topped Baidu's charts of most popular TV dramas in China. It gained attention for
its exquisite costumes, showcase of traditional Chinese medicine and performance of its leads. The series was also noted for featuring a well-respected female figure in China history.

The series was also commercially successful, achieving an average ratings of 1.2 on both Dragon TV and Jiangsu TV and placing first in its ratings slot nationally. It was among the highest rated dramas of the year, and ranked #9 on Huading's Top 100 Satisfaction Survey for TV series.

Ratings 

 Highest ratings are marked in red, lowest ratings are marked in blue

Awards and nominations

References

Chinese medical television series
Chinese historical television series
Alternate history television series
2016 Chinese television series debuts
2016 Chinese television series endings
Television series by Tangren Media
Television series set in the Ming dynasty
Jiangsu Television original programming
Dragon Television original programming
Television series by New Classics Media
Television series set in the 15th century
Television shows set in Beijing